Roaches is an unincorporated community in Casner Township, Jefferson County, Illinois, United States.

References

Unincorporated communities in Jefferson County, Illinois
Unincorporated communities in Illinois